Taikura Rudolf Steiner School is a co-educational state integrated composite school for students in Years 1 to 13, located in Hastings, New Zealand.

Alumni
 Caroline Evers-Swindell, gold-medal winning rower
 Georgina Evers-Swindell, gold-medal winning rower
 Benjamin Crellin, comedian

Notes

External links
 

Secondary schools in the Hawke's Bay Region
Schools in Hastings, New Zealand
Waldorf schools in New Zealand